The Colored Patriots of the American Revolution, With Sketches of Several Distinguished Colored Persons: To Which is Added a Brief Survey of the Conditions and Prospects of Colored Americans, or, in brief, The Colored Patriots of the American Revolution, is an American history book written by William Cooper Nell, with an introduction by Harriet Beecher Stowe. It was published in 1855 by Robert F. Wallcut. It focuses on African-American soldiers during the American Revolution and the War of 1812.  It details "the services of the Colored Patriots of the revolution".

Among other patriots mentioned are Crispus Attucks, the first person killed in the Boston Massacre; Peter Salem, who was instrumental in the victory at Bunker Hill; and Prince Whipple, who participated in George Washington's noted crossing of the Delaware.

The Colored Patriots of the American Revolution is considered by some to be the first history book by and about African Americans that is based on written documentation.

Summary
In 1851, William Cooper Nell, an African-American author, wrote the history Services of Colored Americans in the Wars of 1776 and 1812. It became a standard resource for African-American studies. A few years later, Nell wrote The Colored Patriots of the American Revolution, which also became standard reading. It was commonly taught in schools during that time.

Nell said in the conclusion about the goals of his book: "If others fail to appreciate the merit of the colored man, let us cherish the deserted shrine.  The names which others neglect should only be the more sacredly our care."

Contents
The book is 396 pages long, organized into 18 chapters. It includes sketches of several "Distinguished Colored Persons," as well as an Introduction by American abolitionist and writer Harriet Beecher Stowe, the author of the popular novel Uncle Tom's Cabin (1852).

Introduction
In her Introduction, Mrs. Stowe says the book was intended to highlight American Patriots who had been "all but forgotten" and to help reduce prejudices of both whites and blacks toward African Americans. She says that African Americans had been enslaved in the colonies and their laws "oftener oppressed than protected. Bravery, under such circumstances, has a peculiar beauty and merit."

She concludes, "And their white brothers in reading may remember, that generosity, disinterested courage and bravery, are of not particular race and complexion, and that the image of the Heavenly Father may be reflected alike by all. Each record of worth in this oppressed and despised should be pondered, for it is by many such that the cruel and unjust public sentiment, which has so long proscribed them, may be reversed, and full opportunities given them to take rank among the nations of the earth."

Chapter I - Massachusetts
The first chapter focuses on Massachusetts patriots, such as Crispus Attucks who is considered the first casualty of the American Revolution. As well as the African-Americans on Bunker Hill; such as Seymour Burr, Jeremy Jonah, James and Hosea Easton, Job Lewis, Jack Grove, Bosson Wright, and Phillis Wheatley.

Chapter I also has a section called "Action of the Constitutional Convention in regard to Colored Citizens" as well as "Facts indicating improvement."

Chapter II - New Hampshire
Jude Hall—Legislative Postponement of Emancipation—Last Slave in New Hampshire—Senator Morrill's Tribute to a Colored Citizen

Chapter III - Vermont
Seven hundred British soldiers escorted by a Colored Patriot, Lemuel Haynes, Judge Harrington's Anti-Fugitive-Slave-Law Decision

Chapter IV - Rhode Island
Admission of Hon. Tristam Burges—Defence of Red Bank—Arrest of Major General Prescott by Prince—Colored Regiment of Rhode Island—Speech of Dr. Harris—Loyalty during the Dorr Rebellion

Chapter V - Connecticut
Hon. Calvin Goddard's Testimony—Captain Humphrey's Colored Company—Fac Simile of General Washington's Certificate—Hamet, General Washington's Servant—Poor Jack—Ebenezer Hills—Latham and Freeman—Franchise of Colored Citizens—David Ruggles—Progress

Chapter VI - New York
Negro Plot—Debate in the State Convention of 1821 on the Franchise of Colored Citizens—New York Colored Soldiery—Military Convention in Syracuse, 1854—Extract from a Speech of H. Garnet—Cyrus Clarke's victory at the ballot-box—J. M. Whitfield—Statistical and other facts . . . . . 145-159

Chapter VII - New Jersey
Oliver Cromwell, Samuel Charlton—Hagar—Consistent Fourth of July Celebration

Chapter VIII - Pennsylvania
James Forten—John B. Vashon—Major Jeffrey—John Johnson and John Davis—Wm. Burleigh—Conduct of Colored Philadelphians during the Pestilence—Charles Black—James Derham—The Jury-Bench and Ballot-Box—Gleanings

Chapter IX - Delaware
Prince Whipple—The Colored Soldier at the crossing of the Delaware—Proscriptive Law

Chapter X - Maryland
Thomas Savoy—Thomas Hollen—John Moore—Benjamin Banneker—Frances Ellen Watkins

Chapter XI - Virginia
The last of Braddock's Men—Patriotic Slave Girl—Benjamin Morris—Consistency of a Revolutionary Hero—Simon Lee—Major Mitchell's Slave—Gen. Washington's desire to emancipate slaves—Hon. A. P. Upshur's Tribute to David Rich—Tribute to Washington by the Emancipated—Aged Slave of Washington—Insurrection at Southampton—Virginia Maroons in the Dismal Swamp

Chapter XII - North Carolina
David Walker—Jonathan Overton—Delph Williamson—George M. Horton

Chapter XIII - South Carolina
Hon. Chas. Pinckney's Testimony—Capt. Williamson—Sale of a Revolutionary Soldier—Slaves freed by the Legislature—Veteran of Fort Moultrie—Jehu Jones—Complexional Barriers—Revolt of 1738—The Black Saxons—Denmark Veazie's Insurrection in 1822—William G. Nell

Chapter XIV - Georgia
Massacre at Blount's Fort—Monsieur De Bordeaux—Slave freed by the Legislature

Chapter XV - Kentucky
Henry Boyd, Lewis Hayden, The heroic and generous Kentucky slave

Chapter XVI - Ohio
Cleveland Meeting—Dr. Pennington—Extracts from Oration of William H. Day—Bird's-eye view of Buckeye progress

Chapter XVII - Louisiana
Proclamation of General Jackson—Colored Veterans—Battle of Orleans—Jordan B. Noble, the Drummer—John Julius—Testimony of Hon. R. C. Winthrop—Cotton-Bale Barricade

Chapter XVIII - Florida
Toney Proctor

In popular culture
Glenn Beck broadcast a series of specials on his television program Founders Friday, two of which were dedicated to Black Founders. David Barton (founder and president of WallBuilders, LLC) appeared in both episodes, and mentioned The Colored Patriots of the American Revolution.

References

External links
 The Colored Patriots of the American Revolution (1855)
 

1855 books
American history books
Books about African-American history
Abolitionism in the United States
Works by Harriet Beecher Stowe
Books about the American Revolution